The Ultimate Fighting Championship (UFC) is an American mixed martial arts (MMA) promotion company based in Las Vegas, Nevada. It is owned and operated by Zuffa, a wholly owned subsidiary of Endeavor Group Holdings. It is the largest MMA promotion company in the world as of 2011. It produces events worldwide that showcase 12 weight divisions (eight men's and four women's) and abides by the Unified Rules of Mixed Martial Arts. , it had held over 600 events. Dana White has been its president since 2001. Under White's stewardship, it has grown into a global multi-billion-dollar enterprise.

The UFC was founded by businessman  Art Davie and Brazilian martial artist Rorion Gracie, and the first event was held in 1993 at the McNichols Sports Arena in Denver, Colorado. The purpose of the early Ultimate Fighting Championship competitions was to identify the most effective martial art in a contest with minimal rules and no weight classes between competitors of different fighting disciplines. In subsequent events, more rigorous rules were created and fighters began adopting effective techniques from more than one discipline, which indirectly helped create a separate style of fighting known as present-day mixed martial arts. In 2016, UFC's parent company, Zuffa, was sold to a group led by Endeavor, then known as William Morris Endeavor (WME–IMG), including Silver Lake Partners, Kohlberg Kravis Roberts and MSD Capital for US$4.025 billion. In 2021, Endeavor bought out Zuffa's other owners at a valuation of $1.7 billion.

With a TV deal and expansion in Australia, Asia, Europe, and new markets within the United States, the UFC has achieved greater mainstream media coverage. It earned US$609 million in 2015, and its next domestic media rights agreement with ESPN was valued at $1.5 billion over a five-year term.

History

Early 1990s competition

Art Davie proposed to John Milius and Rorion Gracie an eight-man single-elimination tournament called "War of the Worlds". It was inspired by the "Gracies in Action" video-series produced by the Gracie family of Brazil which featured Gracie jiu-jitsu students defeating martial artists of various disciplines such as karate, kung fu, and kickboxing on Vale Tudo matches. The tournament would also feature martial artists from different disciplines facing each other in no-holds-barred combat to determine the best martial art, and would aim to replicate the excitement of the matches Davie saw on the videos. Gracie accepted, as he was interested in showcasing and promoting his family's own jiu-jitsu for an wide audience. Milius, a film director/screenwriter and Gracie student, agreed to be the event's creative director. Davie drafted the business plan, and 28 investors contributed the initial capital to start WOW Promotions to develop the tournament into a television franchise.

In 1993, WOW Promotions sought a television partner and approached pay-per-view producers TVKO (HBO) and SET (Showtime), and Campbell McLaren and David Isaacs at Semaphore Entertainment Group (SEG). Both TVKO and SET declined, but SEG—a pioneer in pay-per-view television that had produced such offbeat events as a tennis match between Jimmy Connors and Martina Navratilova—became WOW's partner in May 1993. UFC promoters initially pitched the event as a real-life fighting video game tournament similar to Street Fighter and Mortal Kombat. SEG contacted video and film art director Jason Cusson to design a fighting arena for the event. Rorion and Davie didn't want a traditional roped ring, citing fears—by showing old Vale Tudo footage—that the fighters could escape through the ropes during grappling and use it as an advantage, or fall off and hurt themselves. SEG's executives agreed, and also wanted a way to visually differentiate their event from professional boxing and professional wrestling. Some ideas included a traditional roped-ring surrounded by netting, a moat with alligators, a raised platform surrounded by razor-wire fence, electrified fencing, men in togas and netting that could be lowered from the ceiling by a pulley. Eventually Cusson designed an arena with eight sides surrounded by chain-link fence, the trademarked Octagon, which became the event's signature setting. Cusson remained the group's production designer through UFC 27. SEG devised the show's name as The Ultimate Fighting Championship.

WOW Promotions and SEG produced the first event, later retroactively called UFC 1, at McNichols Sports Arena in Denver, Colorado on November 12, 1993. Art Davie was its booker and matchmaker. It proposed to find answers for sports fans' questions such as, "Can a wrestler beat a boxer?" As with most martial arts at the time, fighters typically had skills in just one discipline and little experience against opponents with differing skills. The television broadcast featured kickboxer Kevin Rosier, taekwondo practitioner Patrick Smith, savate fighter Gerard Gordeau, karate expert Zane Frazier, shootfighter Ken Shamrock, sumo wrestler Teila Tuli, boxer Art Jimmerson, and  Brazilian jiu-jitsu black belt Royce Gracie—younger brother of UFC co-founder Rorion, whom Rorion selected to represent his family. Royce's submission skills proved the most effective in the inaugural tournament, earning him the first ever UFC tournament championship after submitting Jimmerson, Shamrock, and Gordeau in succession. The show was extremely successful, with 86,592 pay-per-view television subscribers.

It's disputed whether the promoters intended the event to be a precursor to future events. "That show was only supposed to be a one-off", eventual UFC president Dana White said. "It did so well on pay-per-view they decided to do another, and another. Never in a million years did these guys think they were creating a sport." Davie, in his 2014 book Is This Legal?, an account of the creation of the first UFC event, disputes the perception that the UFC was seen by WOW Promotions and SEG as a one-off, since SEG offered a five-year joint development deal to WOW. He says, "Clearly, both Campbell and Meyrowitz shared my unwavering belief that War of the Worlds would be a continuing series of fighting tournaments—a franchise, rather than a one-night stand."

With no weight classes, fighters often faced significantly larger or taller opponents. Keith "The Giant Killer" Hackney faced Emmanuel Yarbrough at UFC 3 with a 9-inch height and  weight disadvantage.

During this early phase of the organization, the UFC showcased a bevy of styles and fighters. Aside from the aforementioned Royce Gracie, Ken Shamrock, and Patrick Smith, they also featured competitors such as Hall of Famer Dan Severn, Marco Ruas, Gary Goodridge, Don Frye, Kimo Leopoldo, Oleg Taktarov, and Tank Abbott.

In April 1995, following UFC 5 in Charlotte, North Carolina, Davie and Gracie sold their interest in the franchise to SEG and disbanded WOW Promotions.

Tightening up of the rules
Although UFC used the tagline "There are no rules" in the early 1990s, the UFC did in fact operate with limited rules. In a UFC 4 qualifying match, competitors Jason Fairn and Guy Mezger agreed not to pull hair—as they both wore pony tails tied back for the match. The UFC had a reputation, especially in the early days, as an extremely violent event.

UFC 5 also introduced the first singles match, a rematch from the inaugural UFC featuring three-time champion Royce Gracie and Ken Shamrock, called "The Superfight". "The Superfight" began as a non-tournament match that would determine the first reigning UFC Champion for tournament winners to face; it later evolved into a match that could feature either title matches or non-title matches. The "Superfight" would eventually completely phase out tournament matches.

On the other hand, the first "Superfight" at UFC 5 was also considered a failure. In the first minute of the fight Shamrock knocked Royce to the ground and landed inside his guard. For the next 30 minutes Shamrock was inside Royce's guard, with the two throwing punches and headbutts at each other but without any change or action, with the crowd booing the fighters. After 30 minutes the fight was stopped as it had exceeded the time limit allocated for the pay-per-view and was given another 5 minutes of extra time due to protests from the spectators. The fight was over after 36 minutes and a draw was declared. Because of this controversial fight, the UFC would later start to introduce time limits, judges to decide draws, and authorized referees to stand up fighters and restart the bout if they have too much inactivity.

In 1996, the UFC had its first event outside continental United States with UFC 8 in Bayamón, Puerto Rico, and in 1998, UFC Brazil was its first foreign event.

Late 1990s controversy and reform

The violent nature of the burgeoning sport quickly drew the attention of U.S. authorities.

In 1996, Senator John McCain (R-AZ) saw a tape of the first UFC events and immediately found it abhorrent. He led a campaign to ban the UFC, calling it "human cockfighting", and sent letters to the governors of all 50 US states asking them to ban it.

36 states enacted laws that banned "no-holds-barred" fighting, including New York, which enacted the ban on the eve of UFC 12, forcing it to relocate to Dothan, Alabama. The UFC continued to air on DirecTV PPV, though its audience remained minuscule compared to the era's larger cable pay-per-view platforms.

In response to the criticism, the UFC increased cooperation with state athletic commissions and modified its rules to remove the less palatable elements of fights while retaining the core elements of striking and grappling. UFC 12 saw the introduction of weight classes and the banning of fish-hooking. For UFC 14, gloves became mandatory, while kicks to the head of a downed opponent were banned. UFC 15 saw limitations on hair pulling, and the banning of strikes to the back of the neck and head, headbutting, small-joint manipulations, and groin strikes. With five-minute rounds introduced at UFC 21, the UFC gradually rebranded itself as a sport rather than a spectacle.

Led by UFC commissioner Jeff Blatnick and referee John McCarthy, the UFC continued to work with state athletic commissions. Blatnick, McCarthy, and matchmaker Joe Silva created a manual of policies, procedures, codes of conduct, and rules to help in getting the UFC sanctioned by the athletic commissions, many of which exist to this day. Blatnick and McCarthy traveled around the country, educating regulators and changing perceptions about a sport that was thought to be bloodthirsty and inhumane. By April 2000, their movement had clearly made an impact. California was set to become the first state in the U.S. to sign off on a set of codified rules that governed MMA. Soon after, New Jersey adopted the language.

As the UFC continued to work with the athletic commissions, events took place in smaller U.S. markets, and venues, such as the Lake Charles Civic Center. The markets included states that are largely rural and less known for holding professional sporting events, such as Iowa, Mississippi, Louisiana, Wyoming, and Alabama. SEG could not secure home-video releases for UFC 23 through UFC 29. With other mixed martial arts promotions working towards U.S. sanctioning, the International Fighting Championships (IFC) secured the first U.S. sanctioned mixed martial arts event, which occurred in New Jersey on September 30, 2000. Just two months later, the UFC held its first sanctioned event, UFC 28, under the New Jersey State Athletic Control Board's "Unified Rules".

2001 and the beginning of Zuffa era
After the long battle to secure sanctioning, SEG stood on the brink of bankruptcy, when Station Casinos executives Frank and Lorenzo Fertitta and their business partner Dana White approached them in 2000, with an offer to purchase the UFC. A month later, in January 2001, the Fertittas bought the UFC for $2 million and created Zuffa, LLC as the parent entity controlling the UFC.

"I had my attorneys tell me that I was crazy because I wasn't buying anything. I was paying $2 million and they were saying 'What are you getting? Lorenzo Fertitta revealed to Fighters Only magazine, recalling the lack of assets he acquired in the purchase. "And I said 'What you don't understand is I'm getting the most valuable thing that I could possibly have, which is those three letters: UFC. That is what's going to make this thing work. Everybody knows that brand, whether they like it or they don't like it, they react to it. Along with the trademark, they acquired a wooden octagon and around a dozen of fighter contracts. Later on, they negotiated a deal to buy UFC's DVD rights from Lionsgate for two more million dollars.

With ties to the Nevada State Athletic Commission (Lorenzo Fertitta was a former member of the NSAC), Zuffa secured sanctioning in Nevada in 2001. Shortly thereafter, the UFC returned to pay-per-view cable television with UFC 33 featuring three championship bouts.

Struggle for survival and turnaround
The UFC slowly rose in popularity after the Zuffa purchase, due partly to greater advertising, corporate sponsorship, the return to cable pay-per-view, and subsequent home video and DVD releases.

With larger live gates at casino venues like the Trump Taj Mahal and the MGM Grand Garden Arena, the UFC secured its first television deal with Fox Sports Net. The Best Damn Sports Show Period aired the first mixed martial arts match on American cable television in June 2002, as well as the main event showcasing Chuck Liddell vs. Vitor Belfort at UFC 37.5. Later, FSN would air highlight shows from the UFC.

UFC 40 proved to be the most critical event to date in the Zuffa era. The event was a near sellout of 13,022 at the MGM Grand Arena and sold 150,000 pay-per-view buys, a rate roughly double that of the previous Zuffa events. The event featured a card headlined by a championship match between then-current UFC Light Heavyweight Champion Tito Ortiz and former UFC Superfight Champion Ken Shamrock, who had previously left to professional wrestling in the WWE before returning to MMA. It was the first time the UFC hit such a high mark since being forced "underground" in 1997. UFC 40 also garnered mainstream attention from media outlets such as ESPN and USA Today, something that was unfathomable for mixed martial arts at that point in time. Many have suggested that the success of UFC 40 and the anticipation for Ortiz vs. Shamrock saved the UFC from bankruptcy; the buyrates of the previous Zuffa shows averaged a mere 45,000 buys per event, and the company was suffering deep monetary losses. The success of UFC 40 provided a glimmer of hope for the UFC and kept alive the hope that mixed martial arts could become big. Beyond the rivalry itself, the success of UFC 40 was due in part to the marketing and outreach power of crossover athletes – from Pro Wrestling to MMA and MMA to Pro Wrestling – a practice with roots in Japan's Pride Fighting Championships. Long time UFC referee "Big" John McCarthy said that he felt UFC 40 was the turning point in whether or not the sport of MMA would survive in America.

Despite the success of UFC 40, the UFC was still experiencing financial deficits. By 2004, Zuffa had $34 million of losses since they purchased the UFC.

The Ultimate Fighter and the rise in popularity

Faced with the prospect of folding, the UFC stepped outside the bounds of pay-per-view and made a foray into television. After being featured in a reality television series, American Casino, and seeing how well the series worked as a promotion vehicle, the Fertitta brothers developed the idea of the UFC's own reality series.

Their idea, The Ultimate Fighter (TUF) was a reality television show featuring up-and-coming MMA fighters in competition for a six-figure UFC contract, with fighters eliminated from competition via exhibition mixed martial arts matches. It was pitched to several networks, each one rejecting the idea outright. Not until they approached Spike TV, with an offer to pay the $10 million production costs themselves, did they find an outlet.

In January 2005, Spike TV launched The Ultimate Fighter 1 in the timeslot following WWE Raw. The show became an instant success, culminating with a notable season finale brawl featuring light heavyweight finalists Forrest Griffin and Stephan Bonnar going toe-to-toe for the right to earn the six-figure contract. The live broadcast of the season finale drew a very impressive 1.9 overall rating. Dana White credits TUF 1 for saving the UFC, and claims that the contract for the second season was made outside of the venue on a napkin immediately after the finale.

On the heels of the Griffin/Bonnar finale, a second season of The Ultimate Fighter launched in August 2005, and two more seasons appeared in 2006. Spike and the UFC continued to create and air new seasons until the show moved to FX in 2012.

Following the success of The Ultimate Fighter, Spike also picked up UFC Unleashed, an hour-long weekly show featuring select fights from previous events. Spike also signed on to broadcast live UFC Fight Night, a series of fight events debuting in August 2005, and Countdown specials to promote upcoming UFC pay-per-view cards.

After a very successful run on Spike and with the upcoming announcement of the UFC's new relationship with Fox, Spike officials made a statement regarding the end of their partnership with the UFC, "The Ultimate Fighter season 14 in September will be our last... Our 6-year partnership with the UFC has been incredibly beneficial in building both our brands, and we wish them all the best in the future."

With the announcement of UFC's partnership with Fox in August 2011, The Ultimate Fighter, which entered its 14th season in that September, moved to the FX network to air on Friday nights starting with season 15 in the Spring of 2012. Along with the network change, episodes are now edited and broadcast within a week of recording instead of a several-month delay, and elimination fights are aired live.

Mid–2000s expansion

With increased visibility, the UFC's pay-per-view buy numbers exploded. UFC 52, the first event after the first season of The Ultimate Fighter featuring eventual-UFC Hall of Famer: Chuck "The Iceman" Liddell, avenging his defeat to fellow eventual-Hall of Famer, Randy Couture, drew a pay-per-view audience of 300,000, doubling its previous benchmark of 150,000 set at UFC 40. Following the second season of The Ultimate Fighter, the UFC's match between Liddell and Couture drew an estimated 410,000 pay-per-view buys at UFC 57.

For the rest of 2006, pay-per-view buy rates continued to skyrocket, with 620,000 buys for UFC 60: Hughes vs. Gracie—featuring Royce Gracie's first UFC fight in 11 years—and 775,000 buys for UFC 61 featuring the highly anticipated rematch between Ken Shamrock and Tito Ortiz, the coaches of The Ultimate Fighter 3. The organization hit a milestone with UFC 66, pitting Ortiz in a rematch against Liddell with over 1 million buys.

The surge in popularity prompted the UFC to beef up its executive team. In March 2006, the UFC announced that it had hired Marc Ratner, former executive director of the Nevada Athletic Commission, as Vice President of Regulatory Affairs. Ratner, once an ally of Senator McCain's campaign against no holds barred fighting, lobbied numerous athletic commissions to help raise the UFC's media profile in an attempt to legalize mixed martial arts in jurisdictions inside and outside the United States that had yet to sanction the sport.

In December 2006, Zuffa acquired the northern California-based promotion World Extreme Cagefighting (WEC) in order to stop the International Fight League (IFL) from making a deal with Versus (now NBC Sports Network). At the time, the UFC had an exclusive deal with Spike, so the purchase of the WEC allowed Zuffa to block the IFL from Versus without violating their contract. The WEC showcased lighter weight classes in MMA, whereas the UFC featured heavier weight classes.

In December 2006, Zuffa also acquired their cross-town, Las Vegas rival World Fighting Alliance (WFA). The WFA had signed major fighters at the time, most notably Quinton "Rampage" Jackson and Lyoto Machida, but their events turned out to be a financial disaster. Zuffa bought select assets from WFA, including select fighter contracts, as well as trademarks and other intellectual property.

The sport's popularity was also noticed by the sports betting community as BodogLife.com, an online gambling site, stated in July 2007 that in 2007 UFC would surpass boxing for the first time in terms of betting revenues. In fact, the UFC had already broken the pay-per-view industry's all-time records for a single year of business, generating over $222,766,000 in revenue in 2006, surpassing both WWE and boxing.

The UFC continued its rapid rise from near obscurity with Roger Huerta gracing the cover of Sports Illustrated and Chuck Liddell on the front of ESPN The Magazine in May 2007.

Pride acquisition and integration

In Japan, Mixed Martial Arts took a separate, yet convergent evolution, with origins in "shoot wrestling", a form of Professional wrestling which had more realistic-looking moves and matches while deemphasizing theatrical elements. Promotions like Shooto and Pancrase discarded the scripts and were already putting on hybrid fighting shows with real fights by the time the UFC was founded. This resulted in the creation of PRIDE Fighting Championships in 1997. At its height, Pride was the world's most popular MMA promotion, and helped to popularize the sport in Japan and in the world. Having high attendances on large sports arenas and watched by millions of spectators through free-to-air and pay-per-view television. Meanwhile, the UFC was struggling with political persecution, low pay-per-view sales, and doing events in backwater casinos. Most of UFC's best fighters would leave to fight in Japan instead due better pay and prestige.

However, on 2006, Pride started to have financial issues due the termination of lucrative contracts with Japanese TV due a scandal revealing the strong ties between Pride and the Yakuza. On March 27, 2007, the UFC and  Pride announced an agreement in which the majority owners of the UFC, Frank and Lorenzo Fertitta, would purchase the Pride brand.

Initial intentions were for the  organizations to be run separately but aligned together with plans to co-promote cards featuring the champions and top contenders from both organizations, making comparisons to a "Super Bowl" of MMA. However, after purchasing Pride, Dana White felt that the Pride model was not sustainable and that the brand became "toxic" in Japan, begin difficult to find a new television deal. The organization instead folded, with many former Pride fighters such as Antônio Rodrigo "Minotauro" Nogueira, Maurício "Shogun" Rua, Dan Henderson, Mirko "Cro Cop" Filipović, Wanderlei Silva, and others already being realigned under the UFC brand. On October 4, 2007, Pride Worldwide closed its Japanese office, laying off 20 people who were working there since the closing of its parent company Dream Stage Entertainment (DSE).

On June 18, 2008, Lorenzo Fertitta accommodated the UFC's growth by announcing his resignation from Station Casinos in order to devote his energies to the international business development of Zuffa, particularly the UFC. The move proved to be pivotal, as Fertitta helped strike TV deals in China, France, Mexico, and Germany as well as open alternative revenue streams with a new UFC video game and UFC action figures, among other projects.

Late 2000s – mid-2010s growth with UFC 100

Popularity surged in 2009 with UFC 100 and the 10 events preceding it including UFC 90, 91, 92, 94, and 98. UFC 100 was a success garnering 1.6 million buys under the drawing power of former NCAA wrestling and WWE Champion Brock Lesnar and his rematch with former UFC Heavyweight Champion Frank Mir, Canadian Georges St-Pierre going head-to-head with Brazilian Thiago Alves, and American Dan Henderson opposing British Michael Bisping at middleweight after the two were rival coaches on The Ultimate Fighter: United States vs. United Kingdom.

UFC 100 drew interest from ESPN, which provided coverage of the event in the days preceding and following it. ESPN would eventually devote additional coverage of the UFC and other MMA news with the television debut of MMA Live on ESPN2 in May 2010.

The buzz from UFC 100 was hampered significantly in the second half of 2009 after a rash of injuries and other health-related issues—including Brock Lesnar's life-threatening bout with diverticulitis—forcing the organization to continuously scramble and reshuffle its lineup for several events.

However, the momentum gradually began to pick up in the first quarter of 2010 after victories from defending champions Georges St-Pierre and Anderson Silva, as well as Lyoto Machida's first career defeat to "Shogun" Rua for the UFC Light Heavyweight title. These fights segued into a very popular clash between former UFC Champions and rivals Rashad Evans and Quinton Jackson—rival coaches on The Ultimate Fighter 10: Heavyweights—at UFC 114, featuring the UFC's first main event headlined by black fighters. The event scored over 1 million pay per view buys as Evans secured a unanimous decision victory.

This momentum carried into the summer of 2010 at UFC 116, which featured the return of Brock Lesnar defending his UFC Heavyweight title against the undefeated interim-champion Shane Carwin before 1.25 million PPV viewers. Lesnar survived an early barrage of Carwin's punches in a contest that was nearly stopped by referee Josh Rosenthal. However, Lesnar recovered in the second round to submit Carwin via arm-triangle choke to retain the undisputed UFC Heavyweight Championship. The event as a whole was critically acclaimed in the media for living up to the hype with a number of exciting fights.

After a fifth round, last-minute victory by UFC Middleweight Champion Anderson Silva over Chael Sonnen at UFC 117, Lesnar finally surrendered his belt to the undefeated Cain Velasquez via 1st-round TKO at UFC 121. The fight produced Velasquez's eighth knockout or technical knockout in his first nine MMA fights.

UFC 129 featured Georges St-Pierre vs. Jake Shields at the Rogers Centre in Toronto, Ontario, Canada and is currently the largest UFC event in North American history, which coincided with a two-day UFC Fan Expo at the Direct Energy Centre.  The event sold out 55,000 tickets for gate revenues exceeding $11 million, shattering previous MMA attendance and gate records in North America.

On November 5, 2016, the UFC had their first exhibition in New York City after years of being delayed by government officials and red tape with a dramatic first match, Conor McGregor vs. Eddie Alvarez.

WEC merger

Zuffa, the parent company of the UFC, purchased World Extreme Cagefighting in late 2006 and held the first WEC event under new ownership on January 20, 2007. Soon thereafter the WEC made its home on the Versus Network with its first event debuting on that network in June 2007.

On October 28, 2010, Zuffa announced that WEC would merge with the UFC. The WEC held its final card on December 16, 2010. As a result of the merger, the UFC absorbed WEC's bantamweight, featherweight and lightweight weight divisions and their respective fighters. The UFC also made the last WEC Featherweight and Bantamweight Champions, José Aldo and Dominick Cruz respectively, the inaugural UFC Champions of their new weight divisions.

Reed Harris, who started World Extreme Cagefighting with Scott Adams, had mixed emotions on the merger.  "It's kind of like when your kid goes off to college: at first you're not happy, but after you think about it for a while, you're really happy," Harris said  following the announcement. "At the end of the day, I never imagined this thing would be where we're at today. I'm extremely proud and happy that I was involved with something that will now be part of what may be, some day, the largest sports organization in the world."

Strikeforce purchase

On March 12, 2011, Dana White announced that Zuffa had purchased Strikeforce. White said that Strikeforce will operate as an independent promotion, and that Scott Coker will continue to run the promotion. Strikeforce CEO Coker announced the return of Fedor Emelianenko on an unspecified July or August event and said that Zuffa-owned company would continue to co-promote with M-1 Global. After an extension was reached to continue Strikeforce through 2012, the promotion's heavyweight division (sans Heavyweight Grand Prix finalists) was merged into the UFC, and the promotion's Challengers series was ended.

The final Strikeforce show was Strikeforce: Marquardt vs. Saffiedine on January 12, 2013, after which the promotion was dissolved and all fighter contracts were either ended or absorbed into the UFC.

Fox partnership

On August 18, 2011, The Ultimate Fighting Championship and Fox announced a seven-year broadcast deal through the Fox Sports subsidiary, effectively ending the UFC's Spike TV and Versus (now NBC Sports Network) partnership. The deal includes four events on the main Fox network, 32 live Friday night fights per year on their cable network FX, 24 events following The Ultimate Fighter reality show and six separate Fight Night events.

The promotion's first broadcast television event – UFC on Fox: Velasquez vs. dos Santos – broke form by showcasing only one fight to television viewers. In the main event, Junior dos Santos abruptly dethroned then-undefeated UFC heavyweight champion Cain Velasquez by knock-out at 1:04 in the first round. The telecast peaked with 8.8 million viewers tuning into the fight with an average audience of 5.7 million, making it by far the most-watched MMA event of all-time and the most-watched combat sports event since 2003's HBO bout between Lennox Lewis and Vitali Klitschko.

One of the other programming opportunities that emerged was a weekly UFC magazine-style show. When asked about potential for a weekly magazine-style series, UFC CEO Lorenzo Fertitta responded, "Not only weekly, but potentially, multiple times per week you'll have a UFC magazine (show)." The UFC maintained production control of its product including use of its broadcast team, Mike Goldberg and Joe Rogan. Fox Sports produced pre- and post-shows.

Women's MMA

On November 16, 2012, the eve of UFC 154: St. Pierre vs. Condit, Dana White confirmed the UFC would feature women's MMA with the signing of its first female fighter, Strikeforce bantamweight champion Ronda Rousey. She subsequently became the first female UFC champion, the first Olympic medalist with a UFC title, and the first woman to defend a UFC title. She would successfully defend her title six times.

On December 11, 2013, the UFC purchased the contracts of 11 female fighters from Invicta Fighting Championships to launch their 115-pound Strawweight division. Eight of the Invicta fighters took part in the 20th season of The Ultimate Fighter, The Ultimate Fighter: Team Pettis vs. Team Melendez, along with eight additional fighters signed up for the tournament via open tryouts. Season winner, Invicta FC's Strawweight Champion, Carla Esparza became the first UFC women's strawweight champion, defeating Rose Namajunas in the finale. Other fighters on the show included Felice Herrig, Tecia Torres, Joanne Calderwood, Bec Hyatt, Randa Markos, Jessica Penne, and Joanna Jędrzejczyk.

International expansion

The first UFC event to be held outside the contiguous United States was UFC 8 in Puerto Rico, a US territory, in 1996.

Canada has hosted events 18 times, starting with UFC 83 in 2008 and most recently in 2015 with UFC 186. UFC's biggest event to date was also in Canada, as UFC 129 held at Rogers Centre featured a record-breaking attendance of 55,724.

The United Kingdom has been home to 16 events. The first was UFC 38 held in London in 2002. UFC returned to the United Kingdom in 2007 with UFC 70, and visited Northern Ireland for UFC 72. The UK's most recent event was at England with UFC Fight Night: Blaydes vs. Aspinall in 2022. Ireland has held UFC 93 in 2009 and UFC Fight Night: McGregor vs. Brandao 5 years later. In continental Europe, Germany has hosted 6 times, the first being UFC 99 in 2009, UFC 122 in 2010, UFC Fight Night: Munoz vs. Mousasi in 2014, UFC Fight Night: Jędrzejczyk vs. Penne in 2015, UFC Fight Night: Arlovski vs. Barnett in 2016, and most recently, UFC Fight Night: Shogun vs. Smith in 2018. Sweden has hosted 3 times, starting with UFC on Fuel TV: Gustafsson vs. Silva in 2012, and recently with UFC on Fox: Gustafsson vs. Johnson in 2015. Poland had its first event with UFC Fight Night: Gonzaga vs. Cro Cop 2 in 2015.

The first Brazilian event was UFC Brazil: Ultimate Brazil, held in São Paulo in 1998. The promotion did not return to Brazil until 2011 for UFC 134, but since then, the country has hosted a further 20 events. Their most recent visit was UFC Fight Night: Condit vs. Alves. In 2014, Mexico became the second country in Latin America to host an event with UFC 180, followed by a second event, UFC 188, in 2015.

Seven UFC events have been held in Australia, beginning with UFC 110 in 2010 and most recently in December 2018 with UFC Fight Night 142. New Zealand held its first event in 2014, UFC Fight Night: Te Huna vs. Marquardt. Its most recent event was UFC Fight Night: Felder vs. Hooker in February 2020.

In Asia, the UFC has visited 5 countries. Japan had its first visit in 1997 for UFC Japan: Ultimate Japan. The UFC only returned to the country in 2012, with UFC 144. Their last visit was in 2014 for UFC Fight Night: Hunt vs. Nelson, the seventh event there. The promotion has also featured 2 visits to the United Arab Emirates. The first was in 2010 for UFC 112 and the second in 2014 for UFC Fight Night: Nogueira vs. Nelson. The promotion has also visited Macau in 3 occasions: China's special administrative region was first visited in 2012 with UFC on Fuel TV: Franklin vs. Le and last visited in 2014 for UFC Fight Night: Bisping vs. Le. The promotion has also visited Singapore with UFC Fight Night: Saffiedine vs. Lim in 2014. The Philippines was the most recent Asian country that the UFC has visited, with UFC Fight Night: Edgar vs. Faber in 2015.

The Ultimate Fighter has had international editions as well: Brazil (since 2012), Australia (vs. United Kingdom – 2012), China (2013), Canada (vs. Australia – 2014), and Latin America (2014).

TRT ban

On February 27, 2014, the Nevada State Athletic Commission banned the use of Testosterone Replacement Therapy (TRT).  The UFC followed suit and banned the use of TRT for any of their events, including international markets where the UFC oversees regulatory efforts.

Lawsuits over contractual treatment of fighters 

In December 2014, an antitrust lawsuit was filed against Zuffa by several fighters, claiming the organization restricts control over fighters’  careers and earning potential. The case moved to Nevada federal court, where Zuffa was denied its motion to stay discovery for 15 years of its financial records.

This caused an ongoing debate and struggle over how UFC sensitive information should be handled, and who may view it. Especially concerning MMAFA founder, Rob Maysey who has taken the lead in representing the former athletes and has stated he hopes to achieve reforms similar to the Ali Act (2000).

Later that year, a 12–16 month investigation began that was expected to last until sometime between September 2016 to January 2017. Thus far, both sides have provided over 100,000 documents.

It is estimated that the UFC shares between 16% and 22% of its revenue with fighters, which is vastly lower than sports leagues such as the NBA, MLB, and NHL, which share approximately half of the revenue with their athletes.

2016 sale to WME-IMG and a new era

In May 2016, ESPN originally reported that the UFC's parent company Zuffa, LLC was in talks to sell the company for $3.5 billion to $4 billion. In 2015, the UFC had a reported EBITDA of $200–250 million. No official comment was made from the UFC or Dana White regarding the sale. Companies initially interested in the sale were Dalian Wanda Group, China Media Capital, and WME–IMG (Endeavor).

On July 9, 2016, it was officially announced that the UFC would be sold to a group led by WME–IMG, its owner Silver Lake Partners, Kohlberg Kravis Roberts, and MSD Capital, for $4.025 billion. At the time, it marked the largest-ever acquisition in sports. Flash Entertainment (owned by the government of Abu Dhabi) retained its 10% minority stake in the company.  White, who owned 9% of the UFC, stayed, having been given a stake in the new business. White remained president. Fertitta stepped down as chairman and CEO. WME–IMG was renamed Endeavor in September 2017. Three years into the Endeavor era, White revealed that an undisclosed company bid $5 billion but Fertittas chose WME–IMG due to a connection they already made with Ari Emanuel.

In October 2016, MMAJunkie obtained a UFC financial report released by Endeavor, detailing that the promotion had reached a year-to-year high of $609 million in revenue during 2015. 76% of the total was credited to "content" revenue, covering media rights, PPV buys and UFC Fight Pass subscriptions; in turn, 42% of content revenue was credited to pay-per-view buys, followed by U.S. and international media rights.

ESPN partnership 

In May 2018, UFC reached new U.S. media rights deals with Disney Direct-to-Consumer and International and ESPN Inc., succeeding those with 21st Century Fox, which began in January 2019. The five-year contracts are cumulatively valued at $300 million per-year for digital and linear rights, roughly doubling the amount paid by Fox in the final year of its previous contract, and include 42 events on ESPN platforms per-year. ESPN linear networks will televise preliminary cards for UFC PPV events, and 10 UFC on ESPN Fight Night events per-year. The subscription streaming service ESPN+ will broadcast 20 exclusive events per-year under the branding UFC on ESPN+ Fight Night; regardless of network, all Fight Night events will feature a full, 12-fight card, and their preliminaries will air exclusively on ESPN+. The ESPN+ service will also hold on-demand rights to UFC library and archive content, new seasons of Dana White's Contender Series, and other new original content. UFC Fight Pass will be purchasable as an add-on for ESPN+ to stream pay-per-view events.

On March 18, 2019, it was announced that ESPN had reached a two-year extension of the contract. In addition, it was announced that in the United States, future UFC PPVs will only be sold through ESPN+ to its subscribers, and will no longer be sold via traditional television providers beginning with UFC 236. At the same time, the standard price for UFC PPVs was lowered to $59.99 (from $64.99), and new subscribers will be able to purchase a bundle of UFC PPV for a year of ESPN+ too.

M-1 Global partnership 

On July 18, 2018, it was announced that UFC had entered into a partnership with Russian MMA promoter M-1 Global. M-1 Global will serve as a farm league to scout Russian fighters for UFC and will participate in organizing UFC events in Russia. The deal also gave M-1 champions the opportunity to sign with UFC.

2019 Endeavor's initial public offering attempt 

On May 24, 2019 Endeavor Group (EDR) filed initial public offering (IPO) paperwork with the Securities and Exchange Commission. The form detailed Endeavor's revenue was $3.61 billion in 2018 with a net income of $100.1 million after adjustments, and potential risks involved of being potentially sued: (1) “over alleged long-term neurocognitive impairment arising from concussions”, (2) collective bargaining to unionize the MMA athletes, and (3) "five related class-action lawsuits filed against it alleging that UFC violated Section 2 of the Sherman Antitrust Act of 1890 by monopolizing the alleged market for elite professional MMA athletes' services".

On September 26, 2019, Endeavor Group cancelled its planned IPO that was set for September 27. It said in a statement "Endeavor will continue to evaluate the timing for the proposed offering as market conditions develop" The Wall Street Journal reported the under performance of the recent IPO for Peloton was a contributing factor. As is an ongoing lawsuit with several former UFC fighters.

Impact of the COVID-19 pandemic 

Due to the COVID-19 pandemic, the UFC went on with its March 13, 2020 event, UFC Fight Night: Lee vs. Oliveira in Brasília, Brazil, behind closed doors. On March 16, the organization announced that the next three events, UFC Fight Night: Woodley vs. Edwards, UFC on ESPN: Ngannou vs. Rozenstruik, and UFC Fight Night: Overeem vs. Harris, would be postponed to future dates.

In regards to its next pay-per-view, UFC 249 on April 18, UFC president Dana White stated that the event would likely go on, but at a new venue behind closed doors. It was originally to be held at Barclays Center, but a stay-at-home order was issued by the New York state government. On March 18, the New York State Athletic Commission also withdrew its sanctioning for the event. Due to international travel restrictions and other withdrawals, a revised card for UFC 249 was unveiled on April 6 with a location still TBD. The next day, White disclosed that he had booked an unspecified venue for two months, in order to host both UFC 249 and other future events involving U.S. fighters. He also disclosed plans to secure a private island, known as "Fight Island", to host events with international fighters.

The new UFC 249 venue was subsequently revealed to be Tachi Palace—a tribal casino in Lemoore, California; as it is on tribal land, it also fell outside of the jurisdiction of the California State Athletic Commission, meaning that events held there could be self-sanctioned. On April 9, the UFC announced that UFC 249 had been cancelled, and all other UFC events would be suspended until further notice. White cited interventions from high-ranking staff of the UFC's U.S. media rightsholders, ESPN Inc. and parent The Walt Disney Company, as well as Governor Newsom. The New York Post reported that Governor of California Gavin Newsom had contacted Disney chairman and former CEO Bob Iger, urging ESPN and the UFC to not hold the event.

Following the decree that professional sports were deemed as "essential services" in Florida, UFC 249 took place on May 9, 2020, at VyStar Veterans Memorial Arena in Jacksonville, Florida with no fans in attendance. Precautionary health and safety measures proposed by the UFC satisfied the Florida State Boxing Commission, which regulates MMA in the state. UFC Fight Night: Smith vs. Teixeira and UFC on ESPN: Overeem vs. Harris were scheduled to take place at the same venue on May 13 and 16, respectively. On Friday, May 8, the UFC announced middleweight fighter Ronaldo Souza was removed from his bout with Uriah Hall at UFC 249 and quarantined after he tested positive for COVID-19, along with his cornermen, despite following the protocols enforced by the UFC. No other athletes or staff tested positive for the disease.

In April 2021, amid the COVID-19 pandemic, the UFC held its UFC 261 event, again at the VyStar Arena in Jacksonville but with a 100-% sold-out capacity, where attendees were not required to wear masks. Public health experts criticized the event, citing the risks to attendees, as well as to the wider community.

Controversy over eye pokes 

In March 2021, there was strong pressure on the UFC to use new fighter gloves after a severe eye poke ended the final bout at UFC Fight Night: Edwards vs. Muhammad. The official UFC gloves are constructed in a way that leaves the fighters fingers extended forward, whereas there are alternative gloves, which the UFC has not used, which are curved at the knuckle and keep a fighter's fingers tucked down. Fighters, trainers and commentators called for new gloves, citing the harms posed to fighters from the standard UFC gloves.

2021 Endeavor's IPO and Zuffa buyout 

On April 29, 2021, Endeavor Group (EDR) successfully launched an initial public offering (IPO) and became a publicly traded company listed on the New York Stock Exchange. Endeavor subsequently used some of the proceeds from the IPO to buy out Zuffa's other shareholders at a value of $1.7 billion, making Zuffa a wholly-owned subsidiary of Endeavor.

2022 UFC Betting Scandal

On November 5, 2022, controversy arose when the call for a sports betting fraud investigation was made on a fight involving Darrick Minner a student of James Krause, who is an UFC coach and avid bettor, and Shayilan Nuerdanbieke at UFC Fight Night: Rodriguez vs. Lemos. The UFC was informed by sources that suspicious betting patterns had been observed on the fight. Minner became a large betting underdog just hours before the fight, and the cause of the suspicion came when Minner threw a kick with an apparently injured leg, then kicked with it again after showing signs of injury before being finished by technical knockout shortly thereafter. 

On November 6th the UFC released a statement that it's official betting partner would look into the matter, but that none of the fighters, coaches, or officials related to the fight were suspected of any wrongdoing.

On November 18, the Nevada State Athletic Commission informed the UFC and Krause that Krause’s license was suspended and would remain so during the course of the investigation. The UFC then announced that any fighter who chose to continue to be coached by Krause or who continued to train in his gym, would not be permitted to participate in UFC events pending the outcome of the aforementioned government investigations.

Following the controversy UFC introduced rules that banned athletes, coaches, and their close family from betting on UFC events.

Facilities

UFC Performance Institute 

The UFC Performance Institute is the official mixed martial arts school for UFC. The building is located in Las Vegas, Nevada opposite the UFC APEX. The institute was opened in 2017, and is the world's first mixed martial arts center for innovation, research and training. As many as 400 MMA athletes have visited the center, as well as NFL, NBA, NHL and MLB athletes.

UFC Performance Institute- Shanghai
In June 2019, a second facility was opened in Shanghai, China. It has been used to train athletes from China for the Olympic games.

UFC APEX 

The UFC Apex is a live events and production facility. The facility was officially opened on June 18, 2019. In the wake of the COVID-19 pandemic, several UFC events (including UFC 250) were held at Apex behind closed doors. The Octagon at the Apex is notable for being smaller than the Octagon used at all other UFC events, with 25-foot width rather than the usual 30-feet.

Fight Island 

Fight Island is a series of Ultimate Fighting Championship (UFC) mixed martial arts events held on Yas Island in Abu Dhabi, United Arab Emirates in 2020 and 2021 during the COVID-19 pandemic.

Anti-doping policy 

UFC announced a partnership with United States Anti-Doping Agency (USADA) on June 3, 2015, as the UFC's official, independent anti-doping agency. The UFC USADA testing program became effective on July 1, 2015, and includes a minimum of 2,750 drug tests per year with an average of five tests per fighter, and punishments for fighters who fail the tests. Under the UFC Anti-Doping Policy, fighters are subject to random tests at any time and place on all in- and out-of-competition blood and urine samples collected by USADA. Fighters must participate in the testing pool for at least six months prior to a fight in order to qualify for a UFC event.  In February 2017, UFC made changes to the anti-doping policy, effective April 1, 2017, as follows: (1) Fighters who are new to the UFC with no previous contract would be subject to a one-month testing rule. The same rule applies to returning fighters who were terminated or whose contracts were not renewed at the decision of the UFC.  Previously, returning or terminated fighters were required to undergo four months of testings prior to competing in a fight. (2)  Returning fighters who have chosen to retire, go on hiatus, or had a non-renewal of their contract, are required to be in a six-month testing pool prior to competition. (3) No doping violation is handed down to newly signed UFC fighters who voluntarily disclose the use of a prohibited substance prior to testing. (4) "In-competition" testing begins at noon on the weigh-in day and ends one hour after a fighter clears a post-fight medical for non-selected post-fight testing. For fighters who are subjected to post-fight testing the in-competition testing ends after any post-fight testing is done.

In September 2018, it was indicated no announcements would be made on fighters who have been flagged for a potential doping violation until the entire adjudication processes are conducted with the results of the potential doping violation. This came after several cases of fighters, such as Anderson Silva, Junior dos Santos, Josh Barnett and Cris Cyborg, being flagged for potential doping violations, but cleared after they were proved of unintentional use of performance enhancing drugs (usually in the form of contaminated supplements). On November 25, 2019, news surfaced that the UFC and USADA had revised their policies, providing a list of certified supplements that will not lead to sanctions should contaminated samples occur. In January 2021, USADA announced that marijuana would no longer be included in the list of banned substances and they would not penalize any fighter for testing positive for it either before, during, or after a fight. The only exception would be if a fighter was visibly impaired on fight night. Fighters are subject to be suspended up to four years depending on the banned substance used. The common banned substances detected by USADA from suspended fighters are 7-keto-DHEA for weight loss, Anastrozole for estrogen blocker, Clenbuterol for thinning blood to increase oxygen, EPO for stimulating the production of red blood cells which would increase oxygen to muscles, Higenamine for increase heart contraction and speeding up heart rate, Tamoxifen for estrogen blocker, Furosemide, Hydrochlorothiazide for diuretic agent to mask potential doping evidence, Meldonium for stimulating the production of red blood cells which would increase oxygen to muscles, Cocaine, Fentanyl  for substances of abuse, Boldenone, Turinabol- (steroid for horses), Drostanolone, hGH, Ibutamoren, Ipamorelin, LGD-4033, Metandienone, Ostarine, Stanozolol, Trenbolone for increased muscle mass and strength, Androstenedione, Androsta, Clomiphene, Dehydrochloromethyltestosterone, and Testosterone for increased testosterone.

In 2015, USADA conducted 353 tests and 2291 tests in 2016 on 586 UFC fighters with Anderson Silva tested the most of a total of 15 times.  In 2017 and 2018 a total of 2818 and 2888 tests were conducted by USADA respectively.

As of May 16, 2019, a total of 76 UFC fighters had been sanctioned by USADA since the UFC USADA testing program started.

Rules

The current rules for the Ultimate Fighting Championship were originally established by the New Jersey Athletic Control Board. The set of "Unified Rules of Mixed Martial Arts" that New Jersey established has been adopted in other states that regulate mixed martial arts, including Nevada, Louisiana, and California. These rules are also used by many other promotions within the United States, becoming mandatory for those states that have adopted the rules, and so have become the standard de facto set of rules for professional mixed martial arts across the country.

Rounds

UFC matches vary in maximum length, depending on whether the match is for a Championship title, or is a fight card's "main event" fight. In all fights, each round can be no longer than five minutes.  Championship fights last for a maximum of five rounds. Beginning with UFC 138 on November 5, 2011, non-championship "main event" fights (i.e. the final fight on the card) will also last for a maximum of five rounds. Non-main event bouts last for a maximum of three rounds. UFC 263 marked the first time in UFC history that a non-title bout other than the main-event was scheduled for 5 rounds. UFC on FX: Alves vs. Kampmann featured the organization's first two flyweight fights as part of its first flyweight tournament, which consists of bouts that, in the event of a draw, go to a fourth "sudden victory" round held to determine the winner, who advances. There is a one-minute rest period between rounds.

Cage

The UFC stages bouts in an eight-sided enclosure officially named "The Octagon". Originally, SEG trademarked the concept as well as the term and prevented other mixed martial arts promotions from using the same type of cage, but in 2001 Zuffa gave permission for other promotions to use octagonal cages, reasoning that the young sport needed uniformity to continue to win official sanctioning. Today Zuffa reserves exclusive use of the name "The Octagon".

The UFC cage is an octagonal structure with walls of metal chain-link fence coated with black vinyl. The cage sits atop a platform, raising it  from the ground. It has foam padding around the top of the fence and between each of the eight sections. It also has two entry-exit gates opposite each other. The mat (also referred to as the canvas), painted with sponsorship logos and art, is replaced for each event.

Attire

All competitors fight in approved shorts, without shoes. Tops are only approved for female competitors. Required safety equipment include padded gloves, mouthguard, and protective cups held in place with a jockstrap for males. The open-fingered gloves have at least 1" of padding around the knuckles, (110 to 170 g / 4 to 6 ounces) that allow fingers to grab. To ensure compliance, fighters are checked by a State Athletic Committee official before being allowed to enter the cage/ring.

Originally the attire for UFC was very open. Many fighters still chose to wear tight-fitting shorts or boxing-type trunks, while others wore long pants or singlets. Several wore wrestling shoes. Multi-time tournament Champion Royce Gracie wore a Brazilian jiu-jitsu gi in all of his early appearances in UFC (Gracie wore shorts against Matt Hughes at UFC 60), while Art Jimmerson appeared in UFC 1 wearing one standard boxing glove.  As of UFC 133 there has been a ban on speedo style shorts after Dennis Hallman wore one in his fight against Brian Ebersole.  UFC president Dana White was so furious about the fighter's choice of attire that he awarded an honorary "getting those horrifying shorts off TV as soon as possible" bonus of $70,000 to Ebersole for finishing the fight in the first round, and in following post-fight interviews made it clear that speedo style shorts will no longer be tolerated.

Reebok Uniform

On December 2, 2014, the UFC and Reebok held a press conference to announce an exclusive deal for Reebok to become the worldwide outfitter for the UFC, beginning in July 2015. Financial terms of the six-year partnership were not released, but UFC officials said that though the agreement represents the most valuable non-broadcast contract the company has ever signed, the UFC will not directly profit from the new deal. Instead, company execs said the deal is structured so that the "vast majority of the revenue" from the deal – taking out only the costs associated with administering the new program – will be paid directly to UFC fighters.

Payment on the new deal was originally expected to be based on the fighter's spot in the official UFC rankings, with the exception of the UFC champions. Fighters ranked No. 1 to 5 would be paid at one level, No. 6 to 10 at a lower level, No. 11 to 15 below that, and unranked fighters at a base rate. The payments would remain consistent regardless of where the athletes' bouts air. In addition to the per-fight rate, fighters would also receive royalty payments representing 20 percent of any UFC merchandise sold that bears their likeness. The royalty program would also include retired fighters and continue in perpetuity. The deal itself was reported to be worth 70 million dollars which was what the fighters would be paid over the next six years which is roughly 260 thousand dollars per UFC fight card. In April 2015, the UFC announced that they scrapped the idea of the ranking and that payment will be based on the fighter's number of bouts in the octagon, with different tiers (1–5 fights, 6–10 fights, 11–15 fights, and 16–20 fights). Exceptions are made in the event of title fights, with champions and title challengers receiving greater compensation. The kits were revealed on June 30, 2015. All kits feature the fighter's name on the back of the jersey and fighters have the option to choose between a universal kit or a country kit, related to their nationality. There is also a champion kit, designed to be used only by title holders.

The new deal meant that beginning with fight week for UFC 189 in Las Vegas, existing sponsors no longer appear on fighter clothing – not only on fight night but also at all pre-fight media appearances – and in-cage sponsor banners have also eliminated. Fighter camps are outfitted with approved clothing to create a uniform look in athletes' corners. Existing sponsors are still welcome to support UFC fighters. However, third-party logos are no longer allowed on UFC broadcasts, other than title-sponsor slots – similar to those seen with European soccer clubs – that the UFC may eventually sell to "a major, global brand" down the road.

Venum Uniform

On July 11, 2020, UFC announced Venum as the exclusive outfitting partner from April 2021: UFC on ABC: Vettori vs. Holland was the first event with Venum outfits.

UFC announced in October 2021, that Avex Brasil, local producer of Venum brand apparel, has been named the exclusive manufacturer and distributor of UFC Replica Fight Kits and Fight Week apparel sold through retailers in Brazil.  Under the terms of the agreement, Avex Brasil will manufacture officially licensed UFC replica fight kits and fight week apparel for men and women and distribute the product through the country.

Match outcome

Matches may end via:
Submission: a fighter clearly taps the mat or their opponent, verbally submits, or clearly communicates being in pain (such as by yelling) to a degree that causes the referee to stop the fight. Also, a technical submission may be called when a fighter either loses consciousness or is on the verge of or suffers a serious injury while in a hold.
Knockout: a fighter is put into a state of unconsciousness resulting from any legal strike.
Technical Knockout (TKO): If the referee decides a fighter cannot continue, the fight is ruled as a technical knockout. Technical knockouts can be classified into three categories:
referee stoppage (the referee ends the fight because one fighter is deemed unable to intelligently defend themselves)
doctor stoppage (a ringside doctor decides that it is unsafe for one fighter to continue the bout, due to excessive bleeding or physical injuries)
corner stoppage (a fighter's cornerman/cornerwoman signals defeat for their own fighter)
forfeit (a fighter fails to compete or intentionally and prematurely ends the bout for a reason besides injury, resulting in the opponent's victory)
Judges' Decision: Depending on scoring, a match may end as:
unanimous decision (all three judges score a win for fighter A)
majority decision (two judges score a win for fighter A, one judge scores a draw)
split decision (two judges score a win for fighter A, one judge scores a win for fighter B)
technical decision (a fighter is rendered unable to continue as a result of an unintentional illegal element or move, resulting in a decision based on the finished and unfinished rounds if the number of rounds to be judged is sufficient)
unanimous draw (all three judges score a draw)
majority draw (two judges score a draw, one judge scoring a win)
split draw (one judge scores a win for fighter A, one judge scores a win for fighter B, and one judge scores a draw)
technical draw (the bout ends in a manner similar to that of a technical decision, with the judges' scores resulting in a draw)
Disqualification: a fighter intentionally executes an illegal move that is considered by the referee or opponent to be injurious or significant enough to negatively alter the opponent's performance should the fight continue, resulting in the opponent's victory.
No Contest: a fighter is rendered unable to continue or compete effectively as a result of an unintentional illegal element or move and there is not a sufficient number of finished rounds to be judged to make a technical decision viable, or both fighters are rendered unable to continue or compete effectively. Also, a fight may be ruled a no-contest if the original outcome of the bout is changed due to unsatisfactory or illegal circumstances, such as a premature stoppage or a fighter's testing positive for banned substances.

In the event of a draw, it is not necessary that the fighters' total points be equal (see, e.g., UFC 41 Penn vs. Uno, or UFC 43 Freeman vs. White). However, in a unanimous or split draw, each fighter does score an equal number of win judgments from the three judges (0 or 1, respectively). Additionally, if a title fight ends in a draw, the defending champ retains the title.

Judging criteria

The ten-point must system is in effect for all UFC fights; three judges score each round and the winner of each receives ten points while the loser receives nine points or fewer (although 10–10 rounds are given in the rare event that a judge feels the rounds was too close to warrant giving one fighter 10 and the other 9.)  Scores of 10–8 are typically awarded for dominant rounds and anything more dominant is scored less. 10–7 rounds are very rare.

Fouls

The Nevada State Athletic Commission currently lists the following as fouls:

Head-butting
Eye-gouging
Biting
Hair pulling
Fish-hooking
Groin attacks
Putting a finger into any orifice or into any cut or laceration on an opponent (see Fish-hooking)
Small joint manipulation
Striking to the spine or the back of the head (see Rabbit punch)
Striking downward using the point of the elbow (see 12-6 elbow)
Throat strikes of any kind, including, without limitation, grabbing the trachea
Clawing, pinching or twisting the flesh
Grabbing the clavicle
Kicking to the kidney with the heel
Spiking an opponent to the canvas on the head or neck (see Piledriver)
Throwing an opponent out of the ring or fenced area
Holding the shorts or gloves of an opponent
Spitting at an opponent or the referee
Engaging in unsportsmanlike conduct that causes an injury to an opponent
Holding or grabbing the ropes or the fence
Using abusive language in the ring or fenced area
Attacking an opponent on or during the break
Attacking an opponent who is under the care of the referee
Attacking an opponent after the bell (horn) has sounded the end of a round
Flagrantly disregarding the instructions of the referee
Timidity, including, without limitation, avoiding contact with an opponent, intentionally or consistently dropping the mouthpiece or faking an injury
Interference by the corner
Throwing in the towel during competition
Applying any foreign substance to the hair, body, clothing or gloves immediately prior to or during a contest or exhibition that could result in an unfair advantage
If the referee has signalled that the opponent has been knocked out, striking an opponent who is helpless as a result of previous blows and so supported by the ring or fenced area that he or she does not fall
Striking deliberately at the part of the body over the kidneys
Intentionally spitting out the mouthpiece

Fouls against a grounded opponent

Kicking the head of a grounded opponent (see soccer kick)
Kneeing the head of a grounded opponent 
Stomping a grounded opponent

When a foul is charged, the referee in their discretion may deduct one or more points as a penalty. If a foul incapacitates a fighter, then the match may end in a disqualification if the foul was intentional, or a no contest if unintentional. If a foul causes a fighter to be unable to continue later in the bout, it ends with a technical decision win to the injured fighter if the injured fighter is ahead on points, otherwise it is a technical draw.

Match conduct

After a verbal warning the referee can stop the fighters and stand them up if they reach a stalemate on the ground (where neither are in a dominant position or working towards one). This rule is codified in Nevada as the stand-up rule.
If the referee pauses the match, it is resumed with the fighters in their prior positions.
Grabbing the cage brings a verbal warning, followed by an attempt by the referee to release the grab by pulling on the grabbing hand. If that attempt fails or if the fighter continues to hold the cage, the referee may charge a foul.
Early UFC events disregarded verbal sparring / "trash-talking" during matches. Under unified rules, antics are permitted before events to add to the excitement and allow fighters to express themselves, but abusive language during combat is prohibited.

Evolution of the rules

UFC 1 – Although the advertising said There Are No Rules, there were in fact some rules: no biting, no eye-gouging and no groin attacks. Fights ended only in the event of a knockout, submission or the corner throwing in the towel. Despite this, the first match in UFC 1 was won by referee stoppage, even though it was not officially recognized as such at the time.
UFC 2 – Groin attacks were unbanned. Time limits were dropped ending the need for judges. Modifications to the cage were added (the fence became 5 feet tall but would continually grow in height afterwards and the floor became the canvas that is still used today).
UFC 3 – The referee was officially given the authority to stop a fight in case of a fighter being unable to defend himself. A fighter could not kick if he was wearing shoes. This rule would later be discarded, then changed to 'no kicking with shoes while on the ground' and then reinstated, before finally being discarded.
UFC 4 – After tournament alternate Steve Jennum won UFC 3 by winning only one bout, alternates (replacements) were required to win a pre-tournament bout to qualify for the role of an alternate.
UFC 5 – The organizers introduced a 30-minute time limit. UFC 5 also saw the first Superfight, a one-off bout between two competitors selected by the organizers with the winner being crowned 'Superfight champion' and having the duty of defending his title at the next UFC.
UFC 6 – The referee was given the authority to restart the fight. If two fighters were entangled in a position where there was a lack of action, the referee could stop the fight and restart the competitors on their feet, in their own corner. In UFC 6 they officially adopted the 5-minute extension to the 30-minute rule which had been used in UFC 5.
Ultimate Ultimate 1995 – This event was the first to introduce the no fish-hooking rule and to reinstate judges. Time limits were changed to 15 minutes in the quarter-finals, 18 minutes in the semi-finals and 27 minutes in the finals.
UFC 8 – Time limits changed to 10 minutes in the first two rounds of the tournament, 15 minutes in the tournament final and Superfight. Time limits would continually change in the later UFC events. Fights could now be decided by a judges decision if the fight reached the end of the time limit. The panel was made up of three judges who simply raised a card with the name of the fighter they considered to be the winner. In this fashion, a draw was not possible since the only two possible outcomes of a decision were 3 to 0 or 2 to 1 in favor of the winner.
UFC 9 – To appease local authorities, closed fisted strikes to the head were banned for this event only. The commentators were not aware of this last minute rule that was made to prevent the cancellation of the event due to local political pressures. Referee "Big John" McCarthy made repeated warnings to the fighters to "open the hand" when this rule was violated. However, not one fighter was reprimanded. UFC 9 was also the last UFC event to feature the superfight.
Ultimate Ultimate 1996 – This event was the first to introduce the "no grabbing of the fence" rule.
UFC 12 – The main tournament split into a heavyweight (over 200 lb) and lightweight (200 lb and under) division; and the eight-man tournament ceased. Fighters now needed to win only two fights to win the competition. The Heavyweight Champion title (and title bouts) was introduced, replacing the Superfight title (albeit matches were still for a time branded as "Superfights").
UFC 14 – The lightweight division was re-branded middleweight. The wearing of padded gloves, weighing 110 to 170 g (4 to 6 ounces), becomes mandatory. Gloves were to be approved by the UFC. Hair-pulling, groin strikes and kicks to a downed opponent became illegal.
UFC 15 – Limits on permissible striking areas were introduced. Headbutts, elbow strikes to the back of neck and head, and small joint manipulation became illegal.
UFC 21 – Five-minute rounds were introduced, with preliminary bouts consisting of two rounds, regular non-title bouts at three rounds, and title bouts at five rounds. The "ten-point must system" was introduced for scoring fights (identical to the system widely used in boxing).
 UFC 28 – The New Jersey State Athletic Control Board sanctions its first UFC event, using the newly developed Unified Rules of Mixed Martial Arts. Major changes to the UFC's rules included barring knee strikes to the head of a downed opponent, elbow strikes to the spine and neck and punches to the back of the neck and head. Limits on permissible ring attire, stringent medical requirements, and regulatory oversight were also introduced. A new weight class system was also introduced. This new set of rules is currently the de facto standard for MMA events held in the U.S. and is still in use by the UFC.
 UFC 31 – Weight classes are re-aligned to the current standard. Bantamweight moves from 150 to 155 and becomes known as lightweight. Lightweight becomes known as welterweight, middleweight becomes light heavyweight, and a new middleweight class is introduced at 185 pounds. Stools and seconds are first permitted in The Octagon between rounds.
UFC 43 – In the event of a stoppage, fights restart in the position the fight was stopped.
 UFC 94 – After an incident where Georges St-Pierre was accused of putting vaseline on his back, corner men were disallowed from bringing vaseline into The Octagon. Petroleum jelly may now only be applied by UFC employed cutmen.
 UFC 97 – Foot-stomps are banned. (For this event only)
 UFC 133 – Speedo style trunks are banned.
 UFC 138 – First 5-round non-title main event.
 UFC 263 – First 5-round non-title, non-main event bout.

The Ultimate Fighter

Fights that occur on The Ultimate Fighter are classified as exhibition matches under NSAC sanctioning, and thus do not count toward a fighter's professional record. Match outcomes also do not need to be immediately posted publicly, which allows for fight results to remain unknown to the public until the airdate of the episode.

For two-round matches, if there is a draw after two rounds, an extra five-minute round ("sudden victory") is contested. If the extra round concludes without a stoppage, the judges' decision will be based on that final round.

These exhibition matches variably have two or three rounds, depending on the rules used for each season. In most seasons, preliminary matches (before the semi-final bouts) were two rounds; in season two, all matches had three rounds. All matches past the first round use three rounds as per standard UFC bouts. During the finales for each series, the division finals have the standard three rounds, plus a fourth round if the judges score a tie.

Weight divisions/Current champions

The UFC currently uses nine weight classes: Updated as of March 4, 2023, after UFC 285.

Non-title fights have a one-pound leniency. In title fights, the participants must weigh no more than that permitted for the relevant weight division. The Commission may also approve catch weight bouts, subject to their review and discretion.  For example, the Commission may still decide to allow the contest the maximum weight allowed is 177 pounds if it feels that the contest would still be fair, safe, and competitive. In addition, there are five weight classes specified in the Unified Rules which the UFC does not currently use: Super Lightweight (165 pounds), Super Welterweight (175 pounds), Super Middleweight (195 pounds), Cruiserweight (225 pounds), and Super Heavyweight (>265 pounds).

Roster

As of 20 October 2020, the UFC roster consisted of fighters from 71 countries.

Pound-for-pound

As of January 27, 2020, it was announced through Twitter by Bruno Massami that the UFC has decided to separate its pound-for-pound ranking. Men and women will have their own pound-for-pound rankings.

Men's pound-for-pound ranking

Rankings updated on January 24, 2023, after UFC 283.

Women's pound-for-pound ranking

Rankings updated on January 24, 2023, after UFC 283.

UFC events

MMA journalists and fans have criticized the UFC for putting on too many shows and thus diluting the quality of their product.

Production team

Comedian, Brazilian jiu-jitsu and Taekwondo black belt Joe Rogan teams up with play-by-play announcer Jon Anik and Megan Olivi to provide commentary during broadcasts of most UFC events in the US. For 20 years Rogan and Mike Goldberg provided commentary at live events. The "Veteran Voice of the Octagon" is announcer Bruce Buffer. Arianny Celeste, Rachelle Leah, Brittney Palmer, Carly Baker, Vanessa Hanson, Chrissy Blair, Jhenny Andrade, Camila Oliveira, Luciana Andrade, Jamilette Gaxiola, and Red Dela Cruz are Octagon girls. Each fighter is assigned a cutman by the promotion who cares for the fighter before the fight and in between rounds. Jacob "Stitch" Duran was one of the best known cutmen working for the organization. Matches are made by matchmakers, and VP of Talent Relations, Joe Silva and Sean Shelby.

Fighter salaries and contracts

UFC fighters are paid a substantially lower share of revenue than athletes in comparable sports, and other large MMA promotions. UFC fighters are paid per fight, with amounts depending on how well-known the fighters are and how well sponsored a fighter and an event is. Fighters will typically get paid money to fight, called show money, with an additional bonus if they win, called a win bonus. Despite not being officially confirmed by the UFC, Justin Gaethje revealed in January 2019 that headlining an event nets an additional $25,000 per fighter. While fighters new to the UFC can make as little as about $10,000 per fight (without a win bonus), more established fighters have made as much as $500,000 to $1 million per fight. Occasionally, fighters will earn more. For example, at UFC 202, Conor McGregor made a reported $3 million, a UFC record for one fight, while his opponent Nate Diaz made a reported $2 million. The combined $5 million made between the fighters was the largest combined fight purse in UFC history.

Cash bonuses are also awarded for "Fight of the Night" and "Performance of the Night" (formerly awarded separately as "Knockout of the Night"). The size of these bonuses can sometimes be US$80,000 (but are normally US$50,000). For less well-known fighters, they can be several times larger than the contracted amount for the fight. Contracted amounts generally have to be declared to the state athletic commission; however, the UFC also pays undisclosed locker-room bonuses to fighters. In early 2021, Dana White revealed that these bonuses vary from $4,000 to $25,000. In recent years, UFC fighters' contracts and merchandising rights have been the subject of dispute between fighters (represented by growing the Mixed Martial Arts Fighters Association) and UFC, which has attempted to defend existing regulations.

UFC is contractually bound to offer every fighter three fights per calendar year and if they don't, the organization has to pay the fighter for the lacking fights. For example, if the UFC offers a fighter only one fight during the year, they have to pay the fighter for two additional fights. However, if a fight is offered but turned down by the fighter, it is still counted as an offered fight from the contractual viewpoint.

Starting at UFC 273, three "Fan Bonus Of The Night", for every pay-per-view event, will be awarded by Crypto.com, as part of Crypto.com UFC sponsorship incentive fight kits deal, for every pay-per-view event starting UFC 273. Viewers could vote up to three times per pay-per-view on Crypto.com/FanBonus, starting from the opening of the PPV preliminary card and ending an hour after the conclusion of the main card. The bonuses will be paid in bitcoin in US dollars ranging from US$30,000 for first place, US$20,000 for second place, and US$10,000 for third place.

UFC records

UFC Hall of Fame

Media

Television

UFC Connected is a magazine style television show. In 2018 the UFC announced a monthly show to be hosted by UK presenter Layla Anna-Lee With regular contributions from Dan Hardy and John Gooden, UFC Connected features a behind the scenes look at the UFC and its athletes. The show is also shown on BT Sport in the UK.
UFC Now is a long running weekly television show presented by Karyn Bryant. The show has grown in popularity over the years where UFC fighters such as Cub Swanson, Kenny Florian and Alan Jouban appear as regular guests and analysts. The show is available on UFC Fight Pass and is aired on BT Sport in the UK. The show has regular segments such as breaking down the latest fighters for up and coming events, a roundhouse quiz, a top 5 selection and a rapid fire taking questions from fans via various social media platforms. Other guests who have regularly appeared are Michael Bisping, Tatiana Suarez, Daniel Cormier, Brendan Schaub, Brian Ortega and more throughout the years. It was reported in 2016 Schaub will no longer appear due to being banned from the show.
 UFC Tonight is a television series produced by Fox Sports 1 and the UFC. Hosted by Kenny Florian and Karyn Bryant, the program features the latest news, highlights, and analysis from the UFC. This program was carried over to FS1 from Fuel TV (now Fox Sports 2).
 UFC Unleashed is a television series produced by Spike TV and the UFC. It features matches from past UFC events. Episodes are one hour in length, showing several UFC bouts and "best of" compilations of popular fighters such as Chuck Liddell and Randy Couture. In Australia, the show can be seen on Weeknights on FX. In Sweden, the show can be seen on TV4 Sport. In Portugal, the show can be seen on Sic Radical. In Germany, the show can be seen on DSF. In the United Kingdom, the show can be seen on ESPN UK every Thursday at 10 pm. In Denmark, the show can be seen on Canal 8 Sport and Canal 9. In Finland, the show can be seen on MTV3 MAX. In France, the show can be seen on RTL9. In Brazil the show can be seen on Combate In Middle East, the show can be seen on ShowSports and FX Middle East.
Fox UFC (until 2018)
UFC All Access
UFC Primetime
UFC Ultimate Insider
The Ultimate Fighter
UFC on ESPN/ABC (2019–present)
Friends Season 3, Episode 24 "The One with the Ultimate Fighting Champion" is based around the UFC and features Jon Favreau as Pete Becker, Monica's millionaire boyfriend who seeks to become the "Ultimate Fighting Champion," losing his first fight due to his opponent "standing on [his] neck," and the second to a man who "Trains by traveling to Iran and pulling the arms off of thieves." In his third fight, Pete loses to a fighter who "goes for his favorite area," causing Ross to note Pete can no longer have kids.
The Simpsons Season 21, Episode 2 "The Great Wife Hope" is largely based around the UFC where Marge ends up fighting in the octagon at the end of the episode. UFC President White said "We like fighting, but to make it sound like the UFC crowd is this bloodthirsty crowd that shows up and just want to see people get their (butts) kicked – that's not true. That's the stigma that the mainstream has of us." Chuck Liddell starred in the episode. A later reference was featured the episode The Way of the Dog from Season 31, Episode 22 which aired in May, 2020 where Homer wanted to stay in to watch UFC 243 and said "Not tomorrow! Tomorrow is UFC fight 243", he was later seen watching the event on his phone at the seminar. UFC president White also shared the clip on his social media.
Beavis and Butthead Series 8, Episode 14. It was first announced in 2011 that Beavis and Butthead would feature UFC in their comeback season. In the episode "Holding" you see Beavis and Butthead watching the UFC of which creator Mike Judge first announced saying 'They're also watching UFC fights' at a comic con that year. The episode first aired on December 8, 2011, on MTV. UFC president White is a known fan of the show and has referenced Beavis and Butthead in the past as well as hanging out with creator Mike Judge in 2010 where it was reported "White says the UFC and Judge will be working together". In 2016 Judge created an official UFC 200 animated short featuring Daniel Cormier and Jon Jones.

Music

UFC: Ultimate Beatdowns, Vol. 1, an album of music featured in and inspired by the UFC.

Video games

Ultimate Fighting Championship (Dreamcast and PlayStation)
UFC: Tapout (Xbox)
UFC: Throwdown (GameCube, PlayStation 2)
UFC: Tapout 2 (Xbox)
UFC: Sudden Impact (PlayStation 2)
UFC 2009 Undisputed (PlayStation 3 and Xbox 360)
UFC Undisputed 2010 (PlayStation Portable, PlayStation 3, Xbox 360, iPod Touch, iPad, iPhone)
UFC Personal Trainer (PlayStation 3, Xbox 360, Wii)
UFC Undisputed 3 (PlayStation 3, Xbox 360)
EA Sports UFC (PlayStation 4, Xbox One)
EA Sports UFC 2 (PlayStation 4, Xbox One)
EA Sports UFC 3 (PlayStation 4, Xbox One)
EA Sports UFC 4 (PlayStation 4, Xbox One)
In January 2007, Zuffa and video game developer/publisher THQ announced a license agreement giving THQ worldwide rights to develop titles under the UFC brand. The agreement gives THQ exclusive rights to current and next-generation consoles as well as to PC and handheld titles. Also included are "certain wireless rights" which were not detailed. The licensing agreement was set to expire in 2011, although it appeared to have been extended to 2017. On June 4, 2012, THQ announced they will be giving the license of UFC Undisputed to EA.

Action figures

Round 5

The first UFC action figure collectibles were released by Round 5 Corporation in May 2008. Series one of their figures includes Quinton "Rampage" Jackson, Matt Hughes, Tito Ortiz, and Randy Couture. Series two (released on November 10, 2008) includes Wanderlei Silva, Sean Sherk, Rich Franklin, and Anderson Silva.

In July 2009, Round 5 acquired the UFC license through Jakks Pacific and subsequently released five more series under the UFC and Pride brands. Two packs were released in August 2010 and include a UFC Octagon cage and Pride ring display stand. Limited edition versions include fabric walk-out tees or paint variations and are limited in number with foil and holographic packaging variances. Special edition and exclusive versions have been released at various UFC Fan Expo events.

Jakks Pacific

On June 10, 2008, it was announced that UFC had signed an exclusive four-year contract with Jakks Pacific to create action figures for UFC.  the schedule envisages the release of these figures in November 2009. They have currently been 8 series released and they feature special Legends, Pride, and WEC style figures as well. Three 2 packs series have also been released, as well as several expo and internet exclusives. There are also several different octagon cage playsets that have been released, including the "Octagon Playset", "Official Scale Octagon Playset", and "Electronic Reaction Octagon Playset". A Pridestyle ring playset was also originally planned; however, no news have been given on its status or release date since then.

Jakks Pacific UFC Deluxe Figure Lineups

 Series 0: Royce Gracie (Legends Packaging), Brock Lesnar, Frank Mir, Rashad Evans, Keith Jardine, Houston Alexander, Kendall Grove, Miguel Angel Torres (WEC Packaging)
 Series 1: Chuck Liddell, Anderson Silva, Forrest Griffin, Michael Bisping, Evan Tanner (Legends Packaging), Kevin Randleman (Pride Packaging), Cheick Kongo, Mike Swick
 Series 2: Nate Marquardt, Antônio Rodrigo Nogueira, Mike Thomas Brown (WEC Packaging), Bas Rutten (unreleased in this series, moved to series 6), Georges St-Pierre (unreleased in this series, moved to series 6), Lyoto Machida (unreleased in this series, moved to series 5), Quinton Jackson (unreleased in this series, moved to series 8), Thiago Alves (unreleased in this series, moved to series 6)
 Series 3: Chuck Liddell and Mark Coleman (Legends Packaging), Karo Parisyan, B.J. Penn, Jon Fitch, Thiago Silva, Maurício Rua (Pride Packaging)
 Series 4: Wanderlei Silva, Sean Sherk, Rich Franklin, Matt Hughes, Kimbo Slice, Jamie Varner (WEC Packaging), Don Frye (Legends Packaging), Andrei Arlovski (unreleased in this series, later released in series 7)
 Series 5: Lyoto Machida (1 of 100 inserts were also released randomly and contained a special die cast version of the UFC belt), Quinton Jackson (Pride Packaging), Matt Hamill, Dan Severn (Legends), Kenny Florian, Matt Serra, Stephan Bonnar
 Series 6: Thiago Alves, Randy Couture (unreleased, was originally supposed to be a 1 of 100 inserts that was to be released randomly and contain a special die cast version of the UFC belt), Georges St-Pierre, Clay Guida, Frank Mir, Tito Ortiz, Jens Pulver (WEC Packaging), Bas Rutten (Legends)
 Series 7 (if bought at Target, each of them, except for Nogueira, also came with a replica UFC event mini-poster): B.J. Penn (Legends Packaging), Anderson Silva, Andrei Arlovski, Forrest Griffin (Legends Packaging), Diego Sanchez, Antônio Rodrigo Nogueira (Pride Packaging, 1 of 100 inserts were also released randomly and contained a special die-cast version of the Pride belt)
 Series 8: Matt Hughes (Legends Packaging), Chuck Liddell (Pride Packaging), Frankie Edgar (1 of 100 inserts were also released randomly and contained a special die-cast version of the UFC belt), Nate Diaz, Quinton Jackson

 Jakks Pacific UFC Deluxe 2 Packs Figures Lineups

 Series 1: Chuck Liddell vs. Wanderlei Silva, Frank Mir vs. Brock Lesnar, Anderson Silva vs. Rich Franklin
 Series 2: Lyoto Machida vs. Shogun Rua, Georges St-Pierre vs. Matt Hughes, Randy Couture vs. Chuck Liddell (was supposed to be canceled due to copyright issues; however, 1,000 packs managed to make it to several K-Mart stores)
 Series 3: Chuck Liddell vs. Tito Ortiz, B.J. Penn vs. Kenny Florian, Dan Severn vs. Royce Gracie (Legends Packaging)
 Expos Exclusives: Georges St-Pierre (Boston Expo 2010, 1 of 500)
 Ringside Collectibles Internet Exclusives: Forrest Griffin vs. Stephan BonnarThe Ultimate Fighter Season 1 Final, Dana White, Quinton Rampage Jackson 1 of 1000

DVD

Various UFC events have been released onto DVD. UFC 23 through UFC 29 were not released in the US on home video or DVD by SEG. They have since been released onto boxsets which feature around 10 events each set, in chronological order.

PlayStation Network and Xbox Live

UFC on-demand content launched for Xbox 360 on December 20, 2011. Subscribers were able to view pay-per-view events in high definition, connect with friends to predict fight results, and have the ability to compare fighter statistics and records. The UFC Fight Pass application was also planned for PlayStation 4 in early 2015. In 2015, UFC Fight Pass became available on the Xbox One. As of September 2022, no PlayStation version of the app has been released.

NFTs

In August 2021, the UFC began to release NFTs to commemorate big fights, milestones and moments via their official trading card partner, Panini America.

UFC international broadcasters

The UFC's PPV events are broadcast live on Pay-per-view in the US and BT Sport in the UK; BT Sports first ever live event was August 3, 2013 UFC 163 headlined by José Aldo and The Korean Zombie. BT Sport were the first major broadcaster in the UK for the UFC where previously they had small coverage on Bravo, Setanta Sports and finally ESPN UK in August, 2012 until the BT Sport deal was in place. Events are broadcast live on Fighting Sports Network in Pay TV (Cable and Satellite) of SKY Satellite. Free TV Channels in Mexico, Fox Sports and Fox Premium in Pay TV (Cable and Satellite) Central America are broadcast with tape-delay. In Brazil, events are broadcast live on open television through Rede Bandeirantes, which transmits the Fight Night events and preliminary cards of main events, while the numbered events are on Fight Pass. Previously, Rede Globo broadcast it from 2011 on its own Combate Channel, until 2022. In Southeast Asia (exclude the Philippines), Hong Kong, and Papua New Guinea, UFC events are broadcast on Fox Movies Premium (2012-2013) and Fox Sports (2013-2021). In India, events are broadcast on Sony Ten 2, Sony Ten 1, Sony Ten 1 HD and Sony Ten 2 HD. In the Philippines, UFC was also aired on Balls (now ABS-CBN Sports + Action HD) from 2009 until 2015, since moved to Sports5 (including TV5, AksyonTV and Hyper on Channel 91 (SD) and 261 (HD) via Cignal) starting January 3, 2016 until December 31, 2018, and is currently airing on TAP Digital Media Ventures Corporation-owned sports cable television channel Premier Sports since October 2021.  In Indonesia, UFC events are currently broadcast on tvOne starting January 15, 2018; previously, this events was also broadcast on RCTI, iNews since 2012 until the end of 2017. Starting Aprll 13, 2019 UFC's event will be broadcast on Abu Dhabi Media.

See also

List of UFC champions
List of UFC events
List of current UFC fighters
List of UFC bonus award recipients
UFC Fight Pass
Ultimate Fighting Championship controversies

Notes

References

External links

 
1993 establishments in the United States
Mixed martial arts organizations
Ultimate Fighting Championship television series
Sports organizations established in 1993
Kohlberg Kravis Roberts companies
2016 mergers and acquisitions
Companies based in Las Vegas